Ura Mail was a weekly English newspaper published from Dimapur. It was the first local English weekly newspaper published from Nagaland, India.

Journalists 
On 23 September 1992, Chalie Kevichüsa, the editor-in-chief of Ura Mail was assassinated while he was dropping his daughter for her tuition class, when armed men from the NSCN-IM opened fire on his vehicle after several days of tracking his movements at Fellowship Colony, Dimapur. Kevichüsa was killed and his daughter was wounded.

See also 
 List of newspapers in Nagaland

References 

Newspapers published in Nagaland
 Dimapur
Mass media in Nagaland